Quanitra Hollingsworth (born November 15, 1988) is an American-Turkish professional basketball player for Çukurova Basketbol.

In 2012 Hollingsworth acquired Turkish citizenship in order to be eligible to play for Turkey national women's basketball team. Therefore, she missed the 2012 WNBA season and 2014 WNBA season due to Turkish National Team commitments.  She represented Turkey at the 2012 Summer Olympics.

WNBA career statistics

Regular season

|-
| align="left" | 2009
| align="left" | Minnesota
| 34 || 1 || 12.8 || .417 || .000 || .703 || 3.2 || 0.1 || 0.4 || 0.2 || 1.0 || 4.8
|-
| align="left" | 2010
| align="left" | Minnesota
| 25 || 0 || 7.3 || .378 || .000 || .600 || 1.8 || 0.2 || 0.2 || 0.0 || 0.8 || 1.7
|-
| align="left" | 2011
| align="left" | New York
| 31 || 1 || 16.9 || .524 || .000 || .679 || 4.4 || 0.3 || 0.5 || 0.3 || 1.4 || 4.6
|-
| align="left" | 2013
| align="left" | Washington
| 7 || 0 || 6.0 || .556 || .000 || .500 || 1.4 || 0.3 || 0.3 || 0.3 || 0.1 || 1.7
|-
| align="left" | 2015
| align="left" | Seattle
| 27 || 0 || 12.3 || .450 || .000 || .660 || 3.6 || 0.3 || 0.4 || 0.3 || 1.4 || 3.2
|-
| align="left" | Career
| align="left" | 5 years, 4 teams
| 124 || 2 || 12.2 || .456 || .000 || .673 || 3.2 || 0.2 || 0.4 || 0.2 || 1.1 || 3.6

Playoffs

|-
| align="left" | 2011
| align="left" | New York
| 3 || 0 || 8.7 || .571 || .000 || 1.000 || 1.7 || 0.0 || 0.3 || 0.3 || 1.3 || 3.3
|-
| align="left" | 2013
| align="left" | Washington
| 2 || 0 || 2.0 || .000 || .000 || .000 || 0.0 || 0.0 || 0.0 || 0.0 || 0.5 || 0.0
|-
| align="left" | Career
| align="left" | 2 years, 2 teams
| 5 || 0 || 6.0 || .571 || .000 || 1.000 || 1.0 || 0.0 || 0.2 || 0.2 || 1.0 || 2.0

VCU statistics
Source

Honours 
 UMMC Ekaterinburg
 Russian Leagues : 2013
 Russian Cup : 2013
 Fenerbahçe Istanbul
Turkish League : 2016
Turkish Cup : 2015, 2016
Turkish Presidents Cup : 2013, 2014, 2015

See also
Turkish women in sports

References

External links

1988 births
Living people
American emigrants to Turkey
American expatriate basketball people in Latvia
American expatriate basketball people in Lithuania
American expatriate basketball people in Russia
American expatriate basketball people in Turkey
American women's basketball players
Basketball people from Virginia
Basketball players at the 2012 Summer Olympics
Centers (basketball)
Fenerbahçe women's basketball players
Minnesota Lynx draft picks
Minnesota Lynx players
Naturalized citizens of Turkey
New York Liberty players
Olympic basketball players of Turkey
Seattle Storm players
Shanxi Flame players
Sportspeople from Portsmouth, Virginia
Turkish expatriate basketball people in Russia
Turkish people of African-American descent
Turkish women's basketball players
VCU Rams women's basketball players
Washington Mystics players
Galatasaray S.K. (women's basketball) players